The 1988–89 Los Angeles Kings season, was the Kings' 22nd season in the National Hockey League. It saw the Kings finish second in the Smythe Division with a record of 42-31-7, for 91 points.

The 1988–89 season was the first for the great Wayne Gretzky in a Kings uniform. He had come over in a shocking trade with the Edmonton Oilers in the off-season (see below). Paced by Gretzky, Los Angeles led the league in goal scoring, with a total of 376 goals scored. In the playoffs, the Kings upset the Oilers, Gretzky's former team, in seven games in the Smythe Division Semi-finals before being swept in the Smythe Division Finals by the eventual Stanley Cup champion Calgary Flames in four straight games.

This was also the first season that the Kings wore their silver and black uniforms, which they would wear until the 1997–98 season. In the off-season, they had changed their team colours to silver and black from gold and purple, which were more associated with their co-tenants at the Great Western Forum, the National Basketball Association's Los Angeles Lakers. They had also unveiled a new logo that reflected the new team colours.

Offseason

NHL Draft

Wayne Gretzky trade

On August 9, 1988, in a move that drastically changed the dynamics of the NHL, the Oilers traded Gretzky (along with Marty McSorley and Mike Krushelnyski) to the Los Angeles Kings in exchange for Jimmy Carson, Martin Gelinas, $15 million in cash and the Kings' first-round draft picks in 1989 (Jason Miller), 1991 (Martin Rucinsky) and 1993 (Nick Stajduhar). "The Trade", as it came to be known, upset Canadians to the extent that New Democratic Party House Leader Nelson Riis demanded that the government block it and Peter Pocklington was burned in effigy. Gretzky himself was considered a "traitor" by some Canadians for turning his back on his adopted hometown, his home province and his home country; his motivation was widely rumoured to be the furtherance of his wife's acting career. Others believe it was Pocklington who instigated the trade, seeking to benefit personally from the transaction.

Regular season

On October 6, 1988, Wayne Gretzky made his debut as a member of the Los Angeles Kings in a game against the Detroit Red Wings. Gretzky scored on his first shot, and contributed 3 assists in an 8-2 victory. In Gretzky's first season with the Kings, he led the team in scoring with 168 points on 54 goals and 114 assists, and won his ninth Hart Memorial Trophy as the league's Most Valuable Player. He led the Kings to a second-place finish in the Smythe Division with a 42–31–7 record (91 points), and they ranked fourth in the NHL overall.

Gretzky's first season in Los Angeles saw a marked increase in attendance and fan interest in a city not previously known for following hockey. The Kings, who then played their home games at the Great Western Forum, named Gretzky their captain (a position he held until his trade to St. Louis in 1996) and boasted numerous sellouts on their way to reaching the 1989 playoffs.

December 1, 1988: Bernie Nicholls had an eight point game versus the Toronto Maple Leafs.

Season standings

Schedule and results

October

November

December

January

February

March

April

Player statistics

Forwards
Note: GP = Games played; G = Goals; A = Assists; Pts = Points; PIM = Penalty minutes

Defencemen
Note: GP = Games played; G = Goals; A = Assists; Pts = Points; PIM = Penalty minutes

Goaltending
Note: GP = Games played; W = Wins; L = Losses; T = Ties; SO = Shutouts; GAA = Goals against average

Transactions
The Kings were involved in the following transactions during the 1988–89 season.

Trades

Free agent signings

Waivers

Playoffs

Smythe Division Semi-finals
The Kings faced Gretzky's old team, the Oilers, in the first round of the 1989 playoffs. They fell behind 3 games to 1, but rallied to take the series in seven games, helped in no small part by nine goals from Chris Kontos, a little-known player who had just recently been called up from the minor leagues. However, the Kings were quickly swept out of the playoffs in the second round by the eventual Stanley Cup champion Calgary Flames.

 Edmonton Oilers vs. Los Angeles Kings

Los Angeles wins best-of-seven series 4 games to 3

Smythe Division Finals
Los Angeles Kings vs. Calgary Flames

Calgary wins best-of-seven series 4 games to 0

Awards and records
 Wayne Gretzky, Hart Memorial Trophy
 Wayne Gretzky, Center, NHL Second All-Star Team
 Wayne Gretzky, All-Star Game MVP 
 Luc Robitaille, Left Wing, NHL First All-Star Team
 Wayne Gretzky, Club Record, Most Points in One Season (168)
 Bernie Nicholls, Club Record, Most Goals in One Season (70)

References
 Kings on Hockey Database

Los Angeles Kings seasons
Los
Los
Los Angeles
Los Angeles